Lindile Yam (born 8 August 1960) is the former SANDF Chief of staff and former Chief of the South African Army.

Career 
He joined Umkhonto we Sizwe, the military wing of the ANC, in 1981 and became part of the South African National Defence Force in 1994 when all the forces were integrated.

He served as Officer Commanding of 13 South African Infantry Battalion from November 1994 to November 1997.

He attended the Royal College of Defence Studies in 1995 for a Global Security Strategy Course.

He served as the 18th Commandant of the South African Military Academy from 2009 to 2011.

He was promoted to major general and was appointed as the 3rd GOC South African Army Infantry Formation on 1 November 2011. He formally took over command on 2 March 2012 at a parade at the SA Army College in Thaba Tshwane.

He was promoted to lieutenant general and assumed command of the South African Army in January 2016. In November 2019 he was appointed SANDF chief of staff. He left the SANDF in August 2022.

Awards and decorations

  
 
 
 
 
 
 
 
  Grand Officer Order of Military Merit (Brazil)

References

Living people
South African Army generals
1960 births
People from East London, Eastern Cape
Graduates of the Royal College of Defence Studies
Military attachés
UMkhonto we Sizwe personnel